The 1964–65 English football season was Aston Villa's 65th season in the Football League, this season playing in the Football League First Division.

Dick Taylor had moved on to Sheffield United in 1956 to work under Joe Mercer, and two years later joined Aston Villa as Mercer's assistant. He took over as manager late in the 1963–64 season after Mercer resigned due to ill-health, and succeeded in avoiding relegation, which resulted in him being handed the job on a full-time basis. This seasons saw little improvement in form and future financial difficulties loomed.

Alan Deakin and Ron Wylie captained the side while top scorer Tony Hateley netted 34, 20 in the league, 4 in the FA Cup and 10 League Cup Goals.

In November 1964 Aston Villa earned a second consecutive league victory over Burnley with a 1–0 home win.

The FA Cup fifth round matches were scheduled for Saturday, 20 February 1965. Two games required replays during the midweek fixture, and the Aston Villa & Wolverhampton Wanderers match went to a third game the following week, with Wolves the victors.

League table

League results

Results

References

External links
Aston Villa official website
avfchistory.co.uk 1964–65 season

Aston Villa F.C. seasons
Aston Villa F.C. season